A glume is part of the flower of grasses and sedges.

Glume may also refer to:
  (1679–176?), German artist
 Friedrich Christian Glume (1714–1752), German artist

See also 
 Gluma
 Glum